Ashley Guy Sheppard (born January 21, 1969) is a former American football linebacker who played three seasons in the National Football League (NFL) with the Minnesota Vikings, Jacksonville Jaguars and St. Louis Rams. He was drafted by the Vikings in the fourth round of the 1993 NFL Draft. He played college football at Clemson University. Sheppard first enrolled at North Pitt High School in Bethel, North Carolina before transferring to Fork Union Military Academy in Fork Union, Virginia.

Professional career

Minnesota Vikings
Sheppard was selected by the Minnesota Vikings with the 106th pick in the 1993 NFL Draft and signed with the team on July 17, 1993. He played in seventeen games for the Vikings from 1993 to 1994. He was released by the Vikings on August 27, 1995.

Jacksonville Jaguars
Sheppard signed with the Jacksonville Jaguars on August 28, 1995. He played in two games for the Jaguars during the 1995 season. He was released by the Jaguars on September 18, 1995.

St. Louis Rams
Sheppard was signed by the St. Louis Rams on November 20, 1995.  He was released by the Rams on December 6 and re-signed by the team on December 13, 1995. He played in two games for the Rams in 1995.

References

External links
Just Sports Stats

Living people
1969 births
Players of American football from North Carolina
American football linebackers
African-American players of American football
Clemson Tigers football players
Minnesota Vikings players
Jacksonville Jaguars players
St. Louis Rams players
Sportspeople from Greenville, North Carolina
21st-century African-American people
20th-century African-American sportspeople